Sir Moses Puibangara Pitakaka GCMG (23 January 1944 – 25 December 2011) served as the third Governor-General of the Solomon Islands from 7 July 1994 until 7 July 1999. Pitakaka was from Choiseul Province. His widow is Lady Lois Pitikaka.

On 15 June 1999, Pitakaka declared a state of emergency after an outbreak of ethnic violence killed four on Guadalcanal.

He died at the National Referral Hospital in Honiara early on the morning of Christmas Day 2011. He received a state funeral on 28 December.

References

1944 births
2011 deaths
Governors-General of Solomon Islands
Knights Grand Cross of the Order of St Michael and St George
People from Choiseul Province